Lycée des métiers Hélène Boucher is a vocational senior high school in Tremblay-en-France, Seine-Saint-Denis, France, in the Paris metropolitan area.

In August 2016 a riot broke out outside of the high school.

References

External links
 Lycée Hélène Boucher 

Lycées in Seine-Saint-Denis